was a Japanese film director and screenwriter, best known for the epic trilogy The Human Condition (1959–1961), the samurai films Harakiri (1962) and Samurai Rebellion (1967), and the horror anthology Kwaidan (1964). Senses of Cinema described him as "one of the finest depicters of Japanese society in the 1950s and 1960s."

Biography

Early life
Kobayashi was born in Otaru, then a small port on the island of Hokkaido, the son of a company employee. He was a second cousin of the actress and director Kinuyo Tanaka. In 1933 he entered Waseda University in Tokyo where he studied East Asian art and philosophy. He embarked on a career in film in 1941 as an apprentice director at Shochiku Studios, but was drafted into the Imperial Japanese Army in January 1942 and sent to Manchuria.

Kobayashi regarded himself as a pacifist and a socialist, and resisted by refusing promotion to a rank higher than private. In 1944 he was transferred to Miyakojima in the Ryuku Islands, and was taken prisoner near the end of the war. Then he spent a year in a detention camp in Okinawa. After his release, in 1946, he returned to Shochiku as assistant to the director Keisuke Kinoshita.

Films
Kobayashi's directorial debut was in 1952 with Musuko no Seishun (My Son's Youth).

From 1959 to 1961, Kobayashi directed The Human Condition (1959–1961), a trilogy on the effects of World War II on a Japanese pacifist and socialist. The total length of the films is almost ten hours, which makes it one of the longest fiction films ever made for theatrical release.

In 1962 he directed Harakiri, which won the Jury Prize at the 1963 Cannes Film Festival.

In 1964, Kobayashi made Kwaidan (1964), his first color film, a collection of four ghost stories drawn from books by Lafcadio Hearn. Kwaidan won the Special Jury Prize at the 1965 Cannes Film Festival, and received an Academy Award nomination for Best Foreign Language Film.

In 1968, Akira Kurosawa, Keisuke Kinoshita, Kon Ichikawa and Kobayashi founded the directors group, Shiki no kai-The Four Horsemen Club, in an attempt to create movies for younger generations.

In 1969, he was a member of the jury at the 19th Berlin International Film Festival.

He was also a candidate for directing the Japanese sequences for Tora! Tora! Tora! after Akira Kurosawa left the film. But instead Kinji Fukasaku and Toshio Masuda were chosen.

One of his grand projects was a film on Yasushi Inoue's novel about Buddhist China, Tun Huang, which never came to fruition.

Filmography

References

External links

Masaki Kobayashi movies at The Criterion Collection

1916 births
1996 deaths
People from Otaru
Japanese film directors
Japanese pacifists
Imperial Japanese Army personnel of World War II
Samurai film directors
Japanese socialists
Imperial Japanese Army soldiers
Japanese prisoners of war
World War II prisoners of war held by the United States